Meeting MacGuffin is a stop-motion animated short film written, directed and animated by Catya Plate. The film screened at the Academy Awards qualifying HollyShorts Film Festival and Rhode Island International Film Festival, where it won the Grand Prize:Best Animated Short Film in Vortex Edition. It is the sequel of Hanging By A Thread and second in a trilogy of animated shorts.

Plot
In the post-apocalyptic future where humanity is no more, a group of scientists and an animated sign complete the construction of a new human race. They meet a groundhog climatologist with expertise in water renewal who prepares the Homeys for their mission to restore balance to a decimated Earth.

Voice cast
 Richard Steven Horvitz as Gormal MacGuffin
 Misty Lee as LF
 John McBride as Hitch

Reception

Critical response
A four star review about Meeting MacGuffin in 22nd Indiestreet.com states that "Stop motion animation is not a new thing. Quite the opposite. It's the designs of these characters and the world itself, that is really something special.", Indie Shorts Mag says that "‘Meeting MacGuffin’ Is The Best Stop-Motion, Ecological Thriller Out There!".

Accolades

References

External links

2017 films
2010s stop-motion animated films
American animated short films
2017 animated films
2017 short films
2010s English-language films
2010s American films